Arouna N'Joya (born 1908 in Foumban, Cameroon, and died November 1971) was a politician from Cameroon who served in the French Senate from 1947-1958. He was the Minister of Finance of French Cameroon from 1957 to 1958. He received a Resistance Medal after the Second World War.

References 

 page on the French Senate website

Finance ministers of Cameroon
Cameroonian politicians
French Senators of the Fourth Republic
1908 births
1971 deaths
Senators of French Equatorial Africa